Bloomfield (formerly, Adams) is a small unincorporated hamlet in Dawson County, Montana, United States. It is located 23 miles (37 km) northeast of the Yellowstone River and the city of Glendive, which is the county seat for Dawson County. Bloomfield is inside area code 406 and has a post office with ZIP code 59315. The population of the community was 150 at the 2010 census.

The town takes its name from Bloomfield, Nebraska, hometown of settlers J. Berton and Dave Crockett. They were soon followed by other Bloomfield families. Previously the town was part of an Amish community.

Demographics

Climate
According to the Köppen Climate Classification system, Bloomfield has a semi-arid climate, abbreviated "BSk" on climate maps.

References

Unincorporated communities in Montana
Unincorporated communities in Dawson County, Montana